The 2019 World Fencing Championships was held from 15 to 23 July 2019 in Budapest, Hungary.

Schedule
Twelve events were held.

All times are local (UTC+2).

Medal summary

Medal table

Men's events

Women's events

References

External links

 
2019
World Championships
2019 in Hungarian sport
International sports competitions in Budapest
World Championships, 2019
World Fencing Championships